The Citânia de Santa Luzia (also known as the Old City of Santa Luzia) is an archaeological site of the Castro culture located in the Portuguese civil parish of Areosa in the municipality of Viana do Castelo. Its construction dates from the Iron Age, and it shows evidence of occupation during the Roman period. The Castro was first dug in 1876 by Joaquim Possidonio Narciso da Silva. Only about one third of the structures have been dug, with the remaining part being under or destroyed during the construction of the nearby hotel (1900 - c. 1910), church (1904 - 1943), and respective roads. The site also included a possibly medieval chapel dedicated to Saint Lucy which persisted, after some reconstructions, until 1926 when it was destroyed to give way to the Saint Lucy Church of Miguel Ventura Terra.

Architecture 

The Citânia was constructed on the top of the Santa Luzia hill, overseeing the Lima River's delta and is protected by three lines of walls, towers, and two moats. 
The innermost walls (1.20 to 1.25 in thickness) enclose a 30m by 20m area that contains a single circular house and its only entrance faces West.

Ruins of approximately 74 houses have been found.

Most of them have circular foundations or elliptical, and few are rectangular. The houses are found within small, walled neighborhoods.

Findings 
The findings of the Citânia de Santa Luzia include multiple ceramics of the Castro, Roman, and Visigothic eras.

See also 

 Citânia de Briteiros
 Castros in Portugal
 History of Portugal

References 

Former populated places in Portugal
Castros in Portugal
Viana do Castelo